Hazim Abdulrasool Abdulridha (born 1961) is an Iraqi wrestler. He competed in the 1980 Summer Olympics.

References

External links
 

1961 births
Living people
Wrestlers at the 1980 Summer Olympics
Iraqi male sport wrestlers
Olympic wrestlers of Iraq